Nina Nikiforovna Shamanova (born 1937) is a retired Russian rower who won five European titles in the coxed four between 1959 and 1964. In the 2000s she worked as an organizer and referee of rowing competitions.

References

1937 births
Living people
Soviet female rowers
Russian female rowers
European Rowing Championships medalists